Xanthisma paradoxum is a plant species native to the "Four Corners" region where Colorado, Arizona, New Mexico, and Utah meet. It is known only Montezuma County (Colorado), San Juan County (Utah), and Apache County (Arizona). The species is named for the Town of Paradox, Colorado, where the type specimen was collected. It grows in disturbed sites, washes, desert scrub, and open pinyon-juniper woodlands.

Xanthisma paradoxum is a branching herb up to 15 cm (6 inches) high. It has deeply dissected basal leaves which are persistent and dense, plus narrow linear leaves on the lower half of the stems.

References

Astereae
Flora of the Colorado Plateau and Canyonlands region
Flora of Arizona
Flora of Colorado
Flora of Utah
Endemic flora of the United States
Flora without expected TNC conservation status